Lasse Aasland (15 August 1926 – 13 June 2001) was a Norwegian politician for the Labour Party.

Aasland served as a state secretary in the ministry of transport and communications from 1971 to 1972 as a part of the first cabinet of Trygve Bratteli. Later he was appointed state secretary in the ministry of defence in a reshuffle on 1 December 1974 in Trygve Bratteli's second cabinet. Aasland was in office until 15 January 1976. His interment was at Oslo Western Civil Cemetery.

References

1926 births
2001 deaths
Labour Party (Norway) politicians
Norwegian state secretaries